"You Are the Woman" is a song by Firefall, released as the second single from their self-titled debut album. Written by Rick Roberts, then the group's frontman, the track is distinguished by the performance on flute of Firefall member David Muse and the lead vocals of Chuck Kirkpatrick.

Background
Roberts would recall writing "You Are the Woman": "When that chorus and tune jumped into my head I realized I was [not] creating...one of the great works of art in history...[but rather] a bouncy little pop ditty...I was stumped for several months about where the verses should go [ie. develop] lyrically. Then I realized I was over thinking it. I took a more simple approach, and the verses were finished in a day or two."

Steve Heflin recalls that right after the song jumped into Rick's head, a group of his friends were fortunate to have him sing it for them. Steve Heflin, Chris Wienard, and Janet Cooper, were gathered around Rick who was sitting on the arm of an over-stuffed chair in Chris' apartment in Boulder, Colorado.

Release
Introduced on Firefall, the band's debut album recorded at Miami's Criteria Studios and released in the spring of 1976, "You Are the Woman" was issued as the album's second single that summer after several other tracks had received airplay on FM radio including the lead single "Livin' Ain't Livin'", which had just missed the top 40 of the Billboard Hot 100. After two months of support in smaller markets, "You Are the Woman" broke in such larger areas as Chicago and Houston in October 1976, affecting a top 40 entry with a subsequent ascent to a No. 9 peak that November. "You Are the Woman" also peaked at No. 6 on the Easy Listening chart. It also reached the top 20 in Canada and New Zealand.

Reception
Jock Bartley of Firefall would account for the popularity of "You Are the Woman" thus: "Every female between the ages of 18 and 24 wanted to be the woman portrayed in the song, and that caused their boyfriends and spouses to call radio stations and subsequently flood the airwaves with dedications of the song and the sentiment. The message was simple and sincere, and the song was easy to sing. It was like our fans let us be a singing version of the Hallmark card that said what they weren't quite sure what to express."

Bartley also states: "Everybody knows 'You Are The Woman'. It ended up kind of being a hindrance because people would only hear 'You Are The Woman' and would think, oh, that light Rock band from Colorado. We're actually a pretty smokin' Rock band that really has fun onstage and cooks and jams and plays 'You Are The Woman' also."

"You Are the Woman" was remade by Josh Kelley for the Herbie: Fully Loaded soundtrack (2005). It was also covered by Swedish band Blue Swede.

Chart performance

Weekly charts

Year-end charts

References

External links
 Lyrics of this song
 

1976 songs
1976 singles
Firefall songs
Atlantic Records singles
1970s ballads